Founded in 1996, DocStar is a software company that provides document management software, enterprise content management, accounts payable automation programs, and electronic forms, available on-premises or as a cloud-hosted service in the SaaS model. Features include document control, records management, document imaging, intelligent data capture, invoice processing, workflow and business process automation. DocStar software integrates with third-party business applications.

DocStar is headquartered in Schenectady, New York, and is the primary document management service to over 2,000 organizations across North America and the UK.  DocStar serves all industries including manufacturing, food and beverage distribution, legal, insurance, healthcare, state and municipal government, real estate, retail and financial services.

History
On January 3, 2017, DocStar was purchased by Epicor Software Corporation. Astria Solutions Group acquired DocStar in June 2007 from AuthentiDate Holding Corp.

DocStar was formerly known as BitWise Designs Inc. and was founded in 1985 by Rensselaer Polytechnic Institute students John Botti and Ira Whitman. In 1992, BitWise began public trading under the stock symbol BTWS. In 1994 the document imaging division of BitWise was founded as DocStar. In 1998 and 1999, the DocStar division of Bitwise was recognized by Inc. Magazine as one of the nation’s fastest-growing companies. In April 2000, DocStar unveiled its first turnkey system, DocStar SE. DocStar SE provided innovation in the document imaging/management field by allowing simultaneous access to over 100 users at a time per system. 

In March 2001, BitWise designs officially changed its name to AuthentiDate Holding Corporation and began trading under the NASDAQ symbol ADAT. AuthentiDate was the first company to gain official USPS Electronic Postmark (EPM) and DocStar was the first document management platform to integrate the EPM technology.  At present, Authentidate remains the official EPM provider to the United States Postal Service. In 2005 AuthentiDate moved its headquarters from Schenectady, NY, to Berkeley Heights, NJ. The DocStar division remained in Schenectady.

DocStar currently operates in cooperation with over 100 partner resellers who cover approximately 80% of the document imaging markets in the United States.

Products
DocStar ECM is enterprise content management software available as a cloud-based service or on-premises. When deployed in the cloud, DocStar does not require specialized hardware and there is minimal upfront capital investment. DocStar ECM allows access from any Internet-enabled device through a number of supported browsers and offers a fast return on investment.

DocStar Accounts Payable Invoice Processing Automation Solution or AP Automation is designed to capture, process, and route invoices automatically.
AP Automation Features:
Accounting and ERP Software Integration with a major line of business applications like MS Dynamics, SAGE, Epicor, SAP, Infor and more.
Intelligent Data Capture recognition with automatic 2- and 3-way matching and routing
Electronic invoice approval with supporting documentation
Retrieve, view, print and email documents from any computer

DocStar 3thirteen was launched on August 8, 2013. New features include: Customizable Views in the Inbox, Retrieve, and Browse Windows; OCR "On Demand"; Expanded Native File Support; Live Data Link; Customizable Workflow Approval Requests and Embedded Direct-Document Web Works Link.

Software Integrations (Abridged):
AfW
AMS 360 Inhouse
AMS 360 Online
DORIS
ESRI ArcGIS Server 10
Instar
Epicor
Internet Explorer
Microsoft Dynamics AX, GP, NAV, SL
Microsoft Office
Prime
Sage Group MAS 90/200/500 ERP
Sagitta  & Sagitta Online  (AMS Web Services)
TAM
TAM Online

See also
 Accounts payable automation
 Document management system
 Enterprise content management
 Business process automation
 Document imaging
 Records management

References 

 "BITWISE DESIGNS, INC. UNVEILS DOCSTAR IMAGING SYSTEM", Enterprise Magazine, April 2000
 "BitWise begins trading under new name, ticker symbol", The Business Review, March 28, 2001
  USPS Electronic Postmark Homepage
 "Authentidate executives buy last pieces of original company", The Business Review, June 11, 2007
 

Document management systems
Schenectady, New York
Defunct software companies of the United States
Companies established in 1996
Business software
Business software companies